Aníbal is the Spanish and Portuguese masculine given name equivalent of Hannibal (q.v.), itself a latinization of the Greek name Hanníbas (Ἀννίβας), derived from “ḥnbʿl” in the Carthaginian language (Carthaginian Punic script, 𐤇𐤍𐤁𐤏𐤋), a descendant of the Phoenician Canaanite language in which the name's meaning is "Baʿal ([the] Lord) [is] my grace", a cognate of the Hebrew honorific Baʿal (בעל) “master/lord”.

In English, it may refer to:

 Aníbal (wrestler) stagename of Carlos Ignacio Carrillo Contreras (1940–1994), Mexican wrestler
 Aníbal Acevedo (born 1971), Puerto Rican boxer
 Aníbal Acevedo Vilá (born 1962), Puerto Rican politician
 Aníbal Capela (born 1991), Portuguese footballer
 Aníbal Cavaco Silva (born 1939), Portuguese president
 Aníbal González (born 1963), Chilean footballer
 Aníbal González Irizarry (1927-2018), Puerto Rican broadcast journalist
 Aníbal López aka A-1 53167 (1964–2014), Guatemalan artist
 Aníbal Milhais (1895-1970), Portuguese soldier during World War I
 Aníbal Muñoz Duque (1908–1987), Colombian cardinal of the Roman Catholic church
 Aníbal Oswaldo Parada Najarro (born 1984), Salvadorean footballer
 Aníbal Pinto Garmendia (1825–1884), president of Chile
 Aníbal Pinto Santa Cruz (1919–1996), Chilean economist
 Aníbal Sánchez (born 1984), Venezuelan baseball player
 Aníbal Troilo (1914–1975), Argentine tango musician
 Aníbal Zurdo (born 1982), Mexican footballer

See also 
Anibal Zahle, Lebanese sports club based in Zahle. Club's name is a reference to Hannibal the Great
 
 Annibal (disambiguation)
 Annibale, the Italian version of the given name
 Hannibal (disambiguation)

References 

Spanish masculine given names
Carthaginians
Theophoric names